Evgeniy Nikolayevich Belov (born 7 August 1990) is a cross-country skier from Russia.

Career
He competed for Russia at the 2014 Winter Olympics in the cross-country skiing events.

In December 2016, the International Ski Federation (FIS) provisionally suspended six Russian cross-country skiers linked to doping violations during the 2014 Winter Olympics, including Evgeniy Belov. He was officially disqualified from the 2014 Winter Olympics on 1 November 2017 by the International Olympic Committee (IOC).

Cross-country skiing results
All results are sourced from the International Ski Federation (FIS).

Olympic Games

World Championships
 1 medal – (1 bronze)

World Cup

Season standings

Individual podiums
1 victory – (1 , 0 ) 
8 podiums – (4 , 4 )

Team podiums

 3 victories – (3 )
 9 podiums – (9 )

Notes

References

External links
 
 
 

1990 births
Living people
Olympic cross-country skiers of Russia
Cross-country skiers at the 2014 Winter Olympics
Russian male cross-country skiers
Tour de Ski skiers
Russian sportspeople in doping cases
Doping cases in cross-country skiing
Sportspeople from Sverdlovsk Oblast